Audio Antihero is a British independent record label formed in October 2009 and based in South East London. They have been the centerpiece of several radio BBC, PRI and international radio stories.

History
The label's first two releases, Nosferatu D2's We're Gonna Walk Around This City With Our Headphones on to Block Out the Noise and Benjamin Shaw's I Got the Pox, the Pox Is What I Got, brought the label attention and proved popular with alternative press like Drowned in Sound, The Skinny and Pitchfork and radio stations such as BBC 6 Music, Triple R, Resonance FM and NME Radio. They also gained notable supporters in Gareth of Los Campesinos! and Nic Dalton of The Lemonheads.

In 2011, the label released a series of EPs from Ex-Hefner man Jack Hayter, Broken Shoulder, Wartgore Hellsnicker, Paul Hawkins & The Awkward Silences and Fighting Kites. The label also put together a well received charity compilation album, to raise money for Japan entitled Bob Hope Would, which they followed up with a charity busk for Japan in Greenwich, London from Jack Hayter.

2011 saw the label's profile slowly begin to rise. Label founder Jamie Halliday was interviewed by Tom Robinson on BBC 6 Music and wrote a "Do and Don't" guide to running an independent label for the BBC site, while the label was featured in a short list of recommended labels on the Johnny Foreigner blog, and described as "possibly the greatest one man label in the world" by the Another Form of Relief blog.

The label ended 2011 with the debut LP from Benjamin Shaw (There's Always Hope, There's Always Cabernet) which was well received in the music press  and by BBC 6 Music before kicking off 2012 with a second charity compilation, Some.Alternate.Universe, this time for FSID to raise money for their efforts to prevent Infant Death Syndrome. The compilation featured more established artists like Jeffrey Lewis, Jonah Matranga, Art Goblins, Internet Forever, Johnny Foreigner and more. They are now working on a year long series of singles from Jack Hayter entitled The Sisters of St. Anthony.

On 29 August 2012, Audio Antihero and Nosferatu D2 were featured in a retrospective piece for the BBC World Service/PRI production "The World" – which featured interviews with label founder Jamie Halliday and Nosferatu D2 vocalist Ben Parker. The Nosferatu D2 song "We'll Play 'The Power of Love' by Frankie Goes to Hollywood a Thousand Times Tonight" closed the show.

In November 2012, Audio Antihero contributed the Hüsker Doo-wop EP to the Hear It for New York pop-up shop. The EP was released to raise money for the Independent Music Community in New York that was affected by Hurricane Sandy and featured rare/exclusive songs from Nosferatu D2, Benjamin Shaw, Jack Hayter, Superman Revenge Squad and Wartgore Hellsnicker. They followed up this charity EP with This Christmas (I Just Want to Be Left Alone), a Christmas single from Benjamin Shaw & Fighting Kites to raise money for Shelter. The single benefited from critical praise from online press/radio and support from Tom Robinson and Jon Solomon at WPRB. When promoting the single, label founder Jamie Halliday co-hosted The Wrong Rock Show on the legendary Bush Radio, the appearance was endorsed by Rolling Stone.

Audio Antihero kicked off 2013 with a new single from Jack Hayter entitled "Charlotte Badger," a live appearance on the local Croydon Radio station and two guest articles for the GoldFlakePaint music site, a guest interview with Jeffrey Lewis in January and a retrospective "Paint It Back" feature on Gary Numan's Pure album in February. Following the finale of Jack Hayter's "Sisters of St. Anthony" series, Audio Antihero released a charity compilation entitled "REGAL VS STEAMBOAT" to raise money for Rape Crisis England & Wales and Rape Crisis Scotland. The compilation featured artists such as Darren Hayman, Ace Bushy Striptease, Jeffrey Lewis, Bored Nothing, David Cronenberg's Wife and more and was praised by The Quietus, The Skinny and more.

The label followed this with Cloud's "Comfort Songs" LP  which was supported with airplay from Tom Ravenscroft, Gideon Coe and Tom Robinson at BBC Radio 6 Music, John Kennedy at XFM, Simon Raymonde (Bella Union/Cocteau Twins) at Amazing Radio, Eric Lawrence at KCRW and an on-air interview with Robert Rotifer for FM4, the album was also greeted with a very positive response from press, including an 8/10 from Drowned In Sound, a 10/10 from Contact Music, while Pitchfork called it "astoundingly accomplished." Retail were also supportive of the release, "Mother Sea" was included by Rough Trade and The Guardian in their Tracks of the Week subscription, "Cars & It's Autumn" was Google Play's Free Song of the Week while tracks were also featured by Napster and Rdio – Cloud was also featured as "New Band of the Week" by Fairsharemusic.

Audio Antihero's final release of 2013 was The Superman Revenge Squad Band's "There Is Nothing More Frightening Than the Passing of Time" which reunited the label with Ben and Adam Parker of Nosferatu D2. The album saw a lot of support from BBC 6 Music with plays from Steve Lamacq, Gideon Coe and Tom Robinson and very positive press response.

Artists who have released material on Audio Antihero
 Roster
Nosferatu D2
Benjamin Shaw
Jack Hayter
Broken Shoulder
Wartgore Hellsnicker
Paul Hawkins & The Awkward Silences
Fighting Kites
Cloud
The Superman Revenge Squad Band
Low Low Low La La La Love Love Love
Frog
CHUCK
Magana
Broken Broken Bastard
 Compilation guests
Jeffrey Lewis
Jonah Matranga 
Johnny Foreigner 
The Art Goblins 
Still Corners 
younghusband 
Ant 
Shoes & Socks Off 
Darren Hayman 
The Victorian English Gentlemens Club 
Stagecoach 
Extradition Order 
The Owl Service 
Runaround Kids 
David Cronenberg's Wife 
Diane Cluck
Ace Bushy Striptease
Internet Forever
Samira Winter
Melissa Lozada-Oliva
bedbug
Laptop Funeral
SuperKnova
HARDCOREBAE
Kahlil Ali
Brivele
Josaleigh Polett
PHONODELICA
Jonny Teklit
Nicholas Nicholas
mhauesh
Eddie Violet

Discography
Nosferatu D2 – We're Gonna Walk Around This City With Our Headphones On To Block Out The Noise (2009)
Benjamin Shaw – I Got The Pox, The Pox Is What I Got EP (2009)
Jack Hayter – Sucky Tart EP (2011) – 2011 EP SERIES
Various Artists – Bob Hope would. (2011) – digital charity compilation for Japan
Broken Shoulder – Broken Shoulderrr (2011) – 2011 EP SERIES
Wartgore Hellsnicker – Moderate Rock EP (2011) – 2011 EP SERIES
Paul Hawkins & The Awkward Silences – The Wrong Life – EP (2011) – 2011 EP SERIES
Fighting Kites & Broken Shoulder – Split EP (2011) – 2011 EP SERIES
Benjamin Shaw – There's Always Hope, There's Always Cabernet (2011)
Various Artists – Some.Alternate.Universe. (2012) – digital charity compilation for FSID
Jack Hayter – The Sisters of St. Anthony (2012–2013) – digital singles series
Various Artists – The Hüsker Du-wop EP (2012) – digital charity EP for New York's Independent Music Community
Various Artists – REGAL VS STEAMBOAT (2013) – digital charity compilation for Rape Crisis
Various Artists - Audio Antihero's Commercial Suicide Sampler(2013)
Cloud – Comfort Songs (2013)
The Superman Revenge Squad Band – There Is Nothing More Frightening Than the Passing of Time (2013)
Benjamin Shaw – Goodbye, Cagoule World (2014)
Benjamin Shaw / Cloud / Jack Hayter / Broken Shoulder Split - You & Me EP (2014)
Various Artists - Five Long Years (2014)
Low Low Low La La La Love Love Love – Last (2015 – co-released with Other Electricities)
Frog – Kind of Blah (2015)
Frog – Frog (Reissue – 2015)
Nosferatu D2 – Older, Wiser, Sadder EP (2015)
Various Artists – BERN YR IDOLS (2016) – digital benefit compilation for the Bernie Sanders presidential campaign
CHUCK – My Band Is a Computer (2016 – co-released with Old Money Records)
Magana – Golden Tongue EP (2016)
Magana – Pages – Single (2017)
Various Artists – Audio Antihero Presents: 'Unpresidented Jams' for SPLC & NILC (2017)
CHUCK – Frankenstein Songs for the Grocery Store (2017)
Magana – Oceans – Single (2017)
Cloud – Plays With Fire (2018)
Various Artists – The Desperation Club – A Cloud Tribute Compilation (2018)
Benjamin Shaw – Megadead (2018 – co-released with Kirigirsu Recordings)
Frog – Whatever We Probably Already Had It (2018)
Various Artists – Elder Statesman: Nine Long Years of Audio Antihero Records (2019)
Tempertwig – FAKE NOSTALGIA: An Anthology of Broken Stuff (2019 – co-released with Randy Sadage Records)
Benjamin Shaw – Exciting Opportunities: A Collection of Singles and Sadness (2019 – co-released with Old Money Records)
Tempertwig - Films Without Plotlines EP (2019 – co-released with Randy Sadage Records)
Cloud - Live at Kulak's Woodshed (2019)
Fighting Kites - Mustard After Dinner - An Anthology of Fighting Kites (2019 - co-released with Old Money Records)
Benjamin Shaw - Should've Stayed at Home: A Collection of Oddities and Outtakes (2019 - co-released with Old Money Records)
Broken Shoulder - Shark Islands: A Broken Shoulder Archipelago (2019 - co-released with Old Money Records)
Frog - Count Bateman (2019 - co-released with Tape Wormies)
Benjamin Shaw - Live at donaufestival (2019)
Benjamin Shaw - I Got The Pox, The Pox Is What I Got (Remastered & Expanded) (2020 - co-released with Old Money Records)
Benjamin Shaw - There's Always Hope, There's Always Cabernet (Remastered & Expanded) (2020 - co-released with Old Money Records)
Various Artists - From the River to the Sea: The Horrible Truth About Palestine - a Fundraiser for the United Palestinian Appeal (2021)

References

External links
Official website

British independent record labels